Modly is a surname. Notable people with the surname include: 

Doris M. Modly (1933–2018), South African health official
Thomas Modly (born 1960), American businessman and government official